The following tables present the ranks and insignia of the Sri Lanka Army. The ranks are similar to the British army officer ranks and the other ranks. 

At its formation in 1949, the Ceylon Army adopted the rank structures of the British Army.

The highest rank in the Sri Lanka Army is Field Marshal, though the rank has no appointment in the army, it was first awarded in 2015 as an honorary rank to Sarath Fonseka for his war time service, the rank has been awarded for his whole life.

The highest rank of a serving officer is that of Lieutenant General (three-star rank) which is held by the Commander of the Army. The rank of full general (four-star rank) is given to the Chief of Defence Staff (CDS), it is also awarded to the Commander of the Army on the day of his retirement (if the CDS is not appointed from the army). Commanders of the Army since the late 1980s have held the rank of lieutenant general with the exception of Sarath Fonseka and Shavendra Silva who were promoted to full generals while serving as commanders of the army, on the other hand, Shavendra Silva got the duty of the Chief of Defence Staff simultaneously holding the appointment of commander of the army.

Officers

Other Ranks

Retired officer's rank 
An officer of or above rank of captain when retired from service, may retain his/her rank and indicate that he/she is a retired officer with the use of the abbreviation (Rtd) immediately after his/her name.

See also
Star Insignia of Army officer vehicles (Sri Lanka)
Uniforms of the Sri Lanka Army

References

Bibliography
 Army, Sri Lanka. (1st Edition - October 1999). "50 YEARS ON" - 1949–1999, Sri Lanka Army.

External links
 Sri Lanka Army
 Ministry of Defence, Public Security, Law & Order - Democratic Socialist Republic of Sri Lanka

Sri Lanka Army